The Orthacridinae are a sub-family of grasshoppers (Orthoptera : Caelifera) in the family Pyrgomorphidae.  Species are found in: Central America, Africa, Asia, Australia and certain Pacific Islands.  The type genus is Orthacris and the taxon proposed by Bolívar in 1905.

Tribes and genera 
The Orthoptera Species File lists the following:

Tribes A-M 
 Tribe Brunniellini Kevan, 1963 - Philippines
 Genus Brunniella Bolívar, 1905
 Tribe Chapmanacridini Kevan & Akbar, 1964 - W. Africa
 Genus Chapmanacris Dirsh, 1959
 Tribe Fijipyrgini Kevan, 1966 - Fiji
 Genus Fijipyrgus Kevan, 1966
 Tribe Geloiini Bolívar, 1905 - Madagascar
 Genus Geloius Saussure, 1899
 Genus Pseudogeloius Dirsh, 1963
 Tribe Gymnohippini Kevan & Akbar, 1964 - Madagascar
 Genus Gymnohippus Bruner, 1910
 Genus Pyrgohippus Dirsh, 1963
 Genus Uhagonia Bolívar, 1905
 Tribe Ichthiacridini Kevan, Singh & Akbar, 1964 - Mexico
 Genus Calamacris Rehn, 1904
 Genus Ichthiacris Bolívar, 1905
 Genus Sphenacris Bolívar, 1884
 Tribe Ichthyotettigini Kevan, Singh & Akbar, 1964 - Mexico
 Genus Ichthyotettix Rehn, 1901
 Genus Piscacris Kevan, Singh & Akbar, 1964
 Genus Pyrgotettix Kevan, Singh & Akbar, 1964
 Genus Sphenotettix Kevan & Akbar, 1964
 Tribe Malagasphenini Kevan & Akbar, 1964 - Madagascar
 Genus Malagasphena Kevan, Akbar & Singh, 1964
 Tribe Mitricephalini Kevan & Akbar, 1964 - Malesia
 Genus Mitricephala Bolívar, 1898
 Genus Mitricephaloides Kevan, 1963

Nereniini 
Auth. Kevan, 1964;
genus group Kapaoria - New Guinea
 Buergersius Ramme, 1930
 Fusiacris Willemse, 1955
 Kapaoria Bolívar, 1898
 Tarbaleopsis Ramme, 1930
genus group Paratarbaleus - New Guinea
 Modernacris Willemse, 1931
 Noonacris Kevan, 1966
 Paratarbaleus Ramme, 1941
incertae sedis
 Megra Campion, 1923 - New Guinea
 Megradina Storozhenko, 2004 - monotypic: Megradina festiva Storozhenko, 2004 - Vietnam
 Nerenia Bolívar, 1905 - monotypic: Nerenia francoisi Bolívar, 1905  - New Caledonia

Orthacridini 
Auth. Bolívar, 1905; distribution: E. Africa, Madagascar, India, Indo-China.
subtribe Caprorhinina Kevan & Akbar, 1964

 Ambositracris Dirsh, 1963
 Caprorhinus Saussure, 1899
 Dyscolorhinus Saussure, 1899
 Pseudosphena Kevan & Akbar, 1964
 Vittisphena Kevan, 1956
genus group Orthacris

 Burmorthacris Kevan, Singh & Akbar, 1964
 Kuantania Miller, 1935
 Neorthacris Kevan & Singh, 1964
 Orthacris Bolívar, 1884
 Rakwana (insect) Henry, 1933
incertae sedis
 Acropyrgus Descamps & Wintrebert, 1966 - monotypic:
  Acropyrgus cadeti Descamps & Wintrebert, 1966 (Madagascar)

Popoviini
Auth.: Kevan & Akbar, 1964 - E. Africa to India
 Colemania Bolívar, 1910
 Nilgiracris Kevan, 1964
 Parorthacris Dirsh, 1958
 Popovia Uvarov, 1952
 Ramakrishnaia Bolívar, 1917

Tribes P-Z 
 Tribe Psednurini Burr, 1904 - Australia
 Genus Propsednura Rehn, 1953
 Genus Psedna Key, 1972
 Genus Psednura Burr, 1904
 Tribe Sagittacridini Descamps & Wintrebert, 1966 - Madagascar
 Genus Acanthopyrgus Descamps & Wintrebert, 1966
 Genus Sagittacris Dirsh, 1963
 Tribe Verduliini Kevan & Akbar, 1964 - Philippines to PNG
 Genus Verdulia Bolívar, 1905
 Genus Meubelia Willemse, 1932
 Genus Philippyrgus Kevan, 1974
 Genus Spinacris Willemse, 1933

References

External links 

Orthoptera subfamilies
Pyrgomorphidae